Gene Winfield (born June 16, 1927) is an American automotive customizer and fabricator. In the mid-1960s, his designs caught the attention of the film community, resulting in a large body of his work appearing on screen, including in the iconic 1982 film Blade Runner.

Early life

Winfield was born in Springfield, Missouri, in 1927. His family moved to Modesto, California, in 1929, where he grew up. He was first exposed to cars when his older brother, Glenn, opened a wrecking yard. In 1942, he bought his first car for $75, a 1928 Ford coupé, and promptly added a radio antenna with foxtail, despite it having no radio. Later that year, the brothers opened Winfield Used Cars in Modesto.

His second car was a 1930 Ford, powered by a 1937 flathead.

Career in Auto Customizing
In 1951, Winfield became interested in auto racing, driving 135 mph in a Ford Model T ("The Thing") at Bonneville Speedway. He soon opened Winfield's Custom Shop in Modesto, with an early innovation in custom painting, carefully fading two candy colors together, called "The Winfield Fade".

In 1962, building on his experience, Winfield joined Aluminum Model Toys (AMT) as a consultant style designer for their model kits.

Winfield also worked with Detroit automakers who turned to craftsmen to add their custom touches to factory cars. As part of the "Ford Custom Car Caravan", Winfield developed the Pacifica Ford Econoline van, the Mercury Comet Cyclone Sportster, and the Strip Star, an aluminum bodied sports car with a powerful 427 V8 engine.

The Reactor (1964) was Winfield's next aluminum-bodied project, and was even more ambitious. It was a mid-engined front wheel drive two seater, with a very low profile due to the Corvair Chevrolet Turbo-Air 6 engine flat six. It showcased a light aluminum body, like the Strip Star, but the technology went far beyond its novel bodywork. Winfield took the  turbocharged engine from a Corvair Corsa and mated it to the drivetrain from a Citroën DS, and retained the height adjustable Hydropneumatic suspension of the DS.

A January 1967 episode of Bewitched was written around The Reactor and its unique abilities. In 2017, The Reactor was shown at Pebble Beach.

AMT hired him in 1966 to manage the new Phoenix, Arizona based Speed and Custom Division Shop, which built full scale cars as promotional vehicles, including for Star Trek: The Original Series.

Winfield also used the Corvair Chevrolet Turbo-Air 6 engine in a more conventional Rear-engine, rear-wheel-drive layout, The Piranha, a car originally meant to show the usability of ABS plastic in automotive materials.  Winfield began producing this car as a kit, and made it a television star as well, first appearing in March 1967 on The Man from U.N.C.L.E.

After AMT closed this division in 1971, Winfield continued work in the custom auto body field in Southern California and appears as an honored guest at auto related events in the US.

Winfeld was honored as the Detroit Autorama "Builder of the Year" in 2008, and since 2013, has been on the International Show Car Series (ISCA) circuit, chopping tops and shaping sheet metal for the crowds in a special section of each show called "The Summit Racing Equipment Chop Shop".

Filmography

Revered as "The King Of Kustoms", Winfield was featured in the 1st DVD in a series called The Kings Of Kustoms. The series is a documentary and will highlight various car customizers, such as VooDoo Larry from Chicago, Illinois, or Alex Gambino of San Jose, California.

See also
 Concept car

References

Sources 
Jonnie King's Hall Of Fame Legends Series: www.legends.thewwbc.net

External links
 
 

1927 births
Living people
American automobile designers
Vehicle modification people
People from Modesto, California